Polyhymno fuscobasis is a moth of the family Gelechiidae. It was described by Mikhail Mikhailovich Omelko in 1993. It is found in Russia.

References

Moths described in 1993
Polyhymno